Cochlicopa nitens is a species of small air-breathing land snail, a terrestrial pulmonate gastropod mollusk in the family Cochlicopidae.

Distribution
This species is found in Armenia, Austria, Azerbaijan, Belarus, Bulgaria, the Czech Republic, Denmark, Estonia, Georgia, Germany, Hungary, Kazakhstan, Latvia, Lithuania, Moldova, the Netherlands, Poland, Romania, Russia, Serbia and Montenegro, Slovakia, Sweden, Switzerland, Turkmenistan, and the Ukraine.

References

Cochlicopidae
Gastropods described in 1848
Taxonomy articles created by Polbot